The Cox Business Convention Center (formerly the Tulsa Assembly Center, Tulsa Convention Center, and Maxwell Convention Center) is a 310,625 square foot convention center located in downtown Tulsa, Oklahoma.

The Cox Business Convention Center (CBCC) was originally named Tulsa Assembly Center. It was later renamed Maxwell Convention Center after former mayor James L. Maxwell.

In February 2013, Cox Communications acquired the naming rights to the facility, and renamed it the Cox Business Center, to sync with their Cox Business brand. In 2020, "Convention" was added to the name.

2018 CBCC's banquet hall renovation
The CBCC began renovations to convert the arena into a banquet hall in 2018, with a scheduled completion date of 2020.

The CBCC's banquet hall was the largest in the state at 30,000 square feet, however, the venue's $55 million renovations replaced the center's arena with the Grand Hall, a second Banquet space with 41,470 square feet, and 38' ceilings.

It also added a new South Plaza at the main entrance on the east side. This includes a three-story glass atrium, valet drop off, and over 4,000 square feet of pre-function event space. The venue now offers over 275,000 square feet of total rentable space.

The renovation is part of Vision Tulsa, a community improvement initiative funded by a 0.6% increased sales tax in Tulsa County.

BOK Center
The Bank of Oklahoma Center, or BOK Center, which is owned by the City of Tulsa, is the sister venue to CBCC, with both being managed by ASM Global. Together, they comprise the ASM Global-Tulsa. The BOK Center is a 19,199-seat arena, and home to the ECHL Tulsa Oilers. It also hosts major concerts and entertainment shows. It was designed to accommodate arena football, hockey, basketball, concerts, and similar events. The BOK is the former home of the Tulsa Shock of the Women's National Basketball Association and the Tulsa Talons of the Arena Football League.

It cost $178 million in public funds to build, as well as $18 million in privately funded upgrades. The center was completed on August 30, 2008.

CBCC sport team history

The original Tulsa Roughnecks used the CBCC's building for indoor soccer in 1978. In November 2013, it became the home arena of the Tulsa Revolution of the Professional Arena Soccer League. The team relocated to the Expo Square Pavilion in January 2015.

The center was home to the Central Hockey League Tulsa Oilers ice hockey team, and to the Tulsa Talons arena football team before the opening of the new BOK Center in 2008. It was a regular stop for Bill Watts' Mid-South Wrestling and its successor, the Universal Wrestling Federation, until shortly after the UWF was purchased by Jim Crockett Promotions in 1987. It hosted the Missouri Valley Conference men's basketball tournament title game in 1982 and from 1984 to 1987. It was also the home to the Tulsa Golden Hurricane basketball team until the program moved to the Reynolds Center in 1998.

The Professional Bull Riders (PBR) circuit hosted a Built Ford Tough Series event at the Convention Center between 2005 and 2008; since 2009, the event has been held at the BOK Center. From 2009 through 2012, the Convention Center was the home arena for the Tulsa 66ers of the NBA Development League. In 2013, the team returned to the SpiritBank Event Center in nearby Bixby. In March 2012, the now-defunct Oklahoma Defenders of the American Professional Football League played their first game at the arena.

Concerts
Several famous artists have performed at the center, including Aerosmith, Zig Ziglar, The Doors, The Rolling Stones, Elvis Presley, Bon Jovi, Louis Armstrong, Led Zeppelin, Charley Pride, Sonny & Cher, the Carpenters, B.B. King, Glen Campbell, Waylon Jennings, Cheech & Chong, Van Halen, and George Strait.

References

External links

Basketball venues in Oklahoma
Buildings and structures in Tulsa, Oklahoma
Defunct college basketball venues in the United States
Indoor arenas in Oklahoma
Indoor ice hockey venues in the United States
Indoor soccer venues in the United States
North American Soccer League (1968–1984) indoor venues
Defunct NBA G League venues
Sports venues in Tulsa, Oklahoma
Oklahoma City Blue
Tulsa Golden Hurricane men's basketball
Tourist attractions in Tulsa, Oklahoma
Tulsa 66ers
Tulsa Oilers (1964–1984)
1964 establishments in Oklahoma
Sports venues completed in 1964